Poltava International Airport  is a public airport located approximately  west of Poltava, Ukraine. It is one of two airfields near Poltava, the other being Poltava Airbase.
The airport is located near the villages Ivashky and Suprunivka.
Since 2020 the airport is closed due to reconstruction.

History

Built in 1924, Poltava International airport was once able to process 200 passengers per hour.
It took 2 years to build a new terminal, which was opened in 1974. In its best times from 40 to 60 planes used to land here. Back then it employed around 900 people.

Airlines and destinations
Since 2020 the airport is closed due to reconstruction.

See also
 List of airports in Ukraine
 List of the busiest airports in Ukraine

References

1924 establishments in Ukraine
2020 disestablishments in Ukraine
Defunct airports in Ukraine
Buildings and structures in Poltava